Mtatsminda is an administrative district (raioni) in Tbilisi, capital of Georgia.

Mtatsminda District Includes Neighborhoods: Mtatsminda, Sololaki, Vera, Kiketi, Kojori, Shindisi, Tsavkisi, Tabakhmela

References 

Districts of Tbilisi